Agassizia excentrica is a species of sea urchin of the family Prenasteridae. The species was first scientifically described in 1869 by Alexander Agassiz.

See also 
 Aeropsis fulva
 Aeropsis rostrata
 Agassizia scrobiculata

References 

Spatangoida
Animals described in 1869
Taxa named by Alexander Agassiz